Oeonosia is a genus of moths in the family Erebidae described by George Hampson in 1914.

Species
 Oeonosia aurifera Rothschild, 1912
 Oeonosia longistriga (Bethune-Baker, 1908)
 Oeonosia pectinata de Vos, 2007

References

Entomofauna 28(27): 369–376.

Lithosiina
Moth genera